Cymbal and similar can mean:

Cymbal, a percussion instrument made of metal disks
Cymbalom, a stringed instrument
Cymbals (Japanese band), a Japanese rock band
Cymbals (British band), a band from London
Cymbals (album), a recording by Vinicius Cantuária

See also
Symbol
Hi-hat